Saberi Alam (born 12 September) is a Bangladeshi TV and film actress. She is best known for her performances in Madhumati (2011), Basundhara (2017) and Rajneeti (2017).

Career
Saberi started her career in 1979 in Bangladeshi theatres. Later, she acted in many theatre shows. She became a popular TV actress in 1990s, but took a hiatus for marriage. After 13 years, she returned on-screen with TV serial Dolls' House in 2007.

She received a 2016 Anannya Top Ten Awards for her contribution to acting.

Works

Film
 Madhumati (2011)
 Atmodan (2012)
 Rina Brown (2017)
 Rajneeti (2017)
 Ekti Cinemar Golpo (2018)
 Jodi Ekdin (2019)
 Moner Moto Manush Pailam Naa (2019)
 Bidrohi (2020)
 Bikkhov (2021)
 Agamikal (2022)

Television

Personal life
Her younger brother Ahir Alam also worked in television. He died in a road traffic accident on 11 September 2001. Saberi has a son who was born in 2001.

References

Living people
Bangladeshi television actresses
Bangladeshi film actresses
Year of birth missing (living people)